The CAMS 37 was a French 1920's biplane flying boat designed for military reconnaissance, but which found use in a wide variety of roles.

Development
It was the first design for Chantiers Aéro-Maritimes de la Seine (CAMS) by their new head designer, Maurice Hurel.  The prototype was displayed at the 1926 Salon de l'Aéronautique in Paris and first flew the same year. After testing was ordered into service before the end of the year.  It was a conventional biplane flying boat very similar to previous CAMS designs, being driven by a pusher propeller whose engine was mounted on struts in the interplane gap.  The first production version was the amphibious CAMS 37A that was bought by the French Navy, the Portuguese Navy and the aeroclub of Martinique.

Operational history
The aircraft operated from every French Naval Air Station and from many capital ships. 

Trials were conducted by Compagnie Générale Transatlantique on the SS Île de France to evaluate operating catapult-launched mailplanes from transatlantic liners with two specially-built 37/10s. 

René Guilbaud made a long-distance flight over Africa and the Mediterranean between 12 October 1927 and 9 March 1927, venturing as far as Madagascar before returning to Marseille.  In the course of the flight, he covered  in 38 stages without incident.

The  CAMS 37 was gradually withdrawn from front line duties in the mid-to-late 1930s, and when World War II started in September 1939, the aircraft had been relegated to training and communication roles. On mobilisation, however, CAMS 37/11 trainers were used by two units for coastal patrol, with one unit, Escadrille 2S2 continuing in service until August 1940.  Outside mainland France, CAMS 37/11 trainers continued in use with a Free French unit in Tahiti until 15 January 1941, and with a Vichy France unit in Indochina until 1942

Variants

37Flying boat prototype, (one built).

37Aamphibious version (185 built).

37/2pure flying boat version incorporating refinements from 37A amphibian (45 built).

37 A/3reinforced hull (two built).

37 A/6enclosed cabin admiral's barge for Aéronavale (three built).

37A/7(or 37Lia) liaison amphibian (36 built).

37A/9metal-hulled officer transport for French Navy (4 built).

37/10version for catapult trials (two built).

37/11Four-seat liaison / trainer wooden-hulled version (110 built).

37/12civil version with enclosed four-seat cabin (one built).

37/13(or 37bis) metal-hulled version for catapult launching from ships.

37GR(GR – Grand Raids) A single long-range aircraft converted for the 37C prototype, flown by Lieutenant de Vaisseau Guilbaud, from l'Etang de Berre, in the company of Lioré-Olivier LeO H-194 on 12 October 1926, for a proving flight to Madagascar. On 3 January 1927 the engine threw a connecting rod, causing Guilbaud to abandon the Madagascar flight and return to Marseille on 9 March 1927, via Sudan, Egypt, Lebanon, Turkey, Greece, Malta and Tunisia.

37LIA(aka 37 A/7) :see above
37CA single commercial transport prototype, converted to the sole 37GR
37E(E – ecole) Aéronavale designation for CAMS 37/11
37bis(aka 37/13) :see above

Operators

Aviation Navale
French Air Force

Portuguese Naval Aviation

Specifications (37/2)

See also

References

Bibliography

Further reading
 
 

Single-engined pusher aircraft
Biplanes
1920s French military reconnaissance aircraft
Flying boats
37
Aircraft first flown in 1926